Asphodelus macrocarpus is a herbaceous perennial plant belonging to the genus Asphodelus of the Asphodelaceae family. The Latin name macrocarpus of this species derives from the Greek μακρός (meaning large) and καρπειον (meaning fruit), referred to the size of the fruits.

Description
The stem is erect, plain, cylindrical and glabrous. It is supported by fleshy, thickened roots (rhizomes). All the leaves are basal, gutter-shaped and covered by a greyish waxy coating. The stamens have a white filament of about 17 mm. The flowering period extends from late April through June.

Gallery

Distribution and habitat
This plant is typical of the most of the Alps and of the Apennines.

References
 Pignatti S. - Flora d'Italia - Edagricole – 1982 Vol. III
 Asphodelus macrocarpus
 Conti F. et al. - Checklist of the Italian Vascular Flora - Palombi Editori - 2005
 The Plant List
 World Checklist

External links
 Biolib
 Flora italiana

Asphodeloideae
Flora of Europe
Flora of Italy